Ewen Costiou (born 10 November 2002) is a French racing cyclist, who currently rides for UCI WorldTeam .

Major results
2022
 1st Stage 6 Tour de Bretagne
 2nd Overall Tour du Pays de Montbéliard
1st Young rider classification
 2nd  Road race, Mediterranean Games

References

External links

2002 births
Living people
French male cyclists
Sportspeople from Brest, France
Cyclists from Brittany
Mediterranean Games silver medalists for France
Competitors at the 2022 Mediterranean Games